Alexandra Elizabeth Parker is a Dominican beauty pageant title holder, professional artist, actress, and model. She was crowned Miss Earth Dominican Republic 2015 on September 20, 2015.

Personal life
Born October 7, 1994 in Higuey, Dominican Republic she is a dual citizen of the United States and Dominican Republic. She grew up in Santo Domingo, Dominican Republic, Lakeland, Florida and Sylva, North Carolina. She currently resides in Los Angeles, California.

Career
She began modeling at the age of 15 and has appeared in numerous publications, television shows and movies. She competed in the Miss Earth worldwide pageant in Vienna, Austria in December 2015. In June 2018 she booked the lead role for a new Playboy TV series called "Seven Motives," playing Eva, the ex wife. The show first aired on June 29th, 2018, airing a new episode every Friday.

References

Miss Earth 2015 contestants
Miss Dominican Republic
Dominican Republic beauty pageant winners
1994 births
Living people